In mathematics, especially functional analysis, Bessel's inequality is a statement about the coefficients of an element   in a Hilbert space with respect to an orthonormal sequence. The inequality was derived by F.W. Bessel in 1828.

Then, for any  in  one has

where ⟨·,·⟩ denotes the inner product in the Hilbert space . If we define the infinite sum

consisting of "infinite sum" of vector resolute  in direction , Bessel's inequality tells us that this series converges. One can think of it that there exists  that can be described in terms of potential basis .

For a complete orthonormal sequence (that is, for an orthonormal sequence that is a basis), we have Parseval's identity, which replaces the inequality with an equality (and consequently  with ).

Bessel's inequality follows from the identity

which holds for any natural n.

See also
 Cauchy–Schwarz inequality
 Parseval's theorem

References

External links

 
 Bessel's Inequality the article on Bessel's Inequality on MathWorld.

Hilbert space
Inequalities